Bhulia is an Indian Hindu caste originally from western Odisha but presently found throughout Odisha .

The Bhulia have a high position with the weaver caste system. They have no sub castes. They are a weaver caste known primarily for their tie-dye fabrics (known as sambalpuri).

Bhulia caste members all use the surname Meher, and are therefore sometimes also referred to as the Meher Tanti (tanti being a generic term for all weaver castes).

Kapta 
Kapata also called "Khan", was a cotton piece good produced in various dimensions. Bhulia weavers were used to weave this cloth. It was a handwoven native cloth primarily used for female clothes such as blouses.

In Kannada language "Kapata is an article of cloth".

References

Indian castes
Weaving communities of South Asia